Unsighted (also stylized as UNSIGHTED) is a 2021 indie Metroidvania adventure game developed by Studio Pixel Punk and published by Humble Games. It released for Nintendo Switch, Windows, Xbox Series X/S, Xbox One and PS4.

Development
The game's developers, Tiani Pixel and Fernanda Dias, cited Pikmin, The Legend of Zelda, Metroid, and Dark Souls as influences.

Pixel and Dias included an "Explorer mode" with decreased difficulty to give players options for how to complete the game. The inclusion of Explorer mode was also inspired by speedrunners, as it gives players the option to explore and learn about the game with fewer constraints.

Reception

The game received "generally favorable" reviews from critics, according to review aggregator Metacritic. In a review of the game written for Esquire, Dom Nero praised the game's action and style, but wrote that the game's "real brilliance" was its exploration of "the idea of consciousness, and the fear of losing it".

In a review for Polygon, Nicole Clark praised Unsighted, referring to it as a "must play" due to the "sense of urgency" cultivated by in-game time constraints. Writing for Vice, Moises Taveras wrote that he felt the same time constraints at first created a sense of "tension" but eventually "began to feel more like a mean-spirited taunt". Taveras encouraged players to use the game's Explorer mode to counter this feeling. The game was named one of the best games of 2021 by Polygon. In a review for Kotaku, Renata Price praised the game as the best metroidvania of the year.

References

2021 video games
Apocalyptic video games
Humble Games games
Metroidvania games
Nintendo Switch games
Indie video games
Video games developed in Brazil
Video games featuring female protagonists
Windows games
Xbox One games
Xbox Series X and Series S games
Single-player video games